"Mutter" (German for "mother") is a power ballad by German Neue Deutsche Härte band Rammstein, released as the fourth single from the album of the same name. The single release includes "5/4", a song that is instrumental except for a Speak & Spell dialogue sample that was played as the intro for live shows since 2000, but wasn't released until 2002.

Overview
The song was confirmed by frontman Till Lindemann and guitarist Richard Kruspe to be a reference to their unhappy childhood relationships with their own mothers. The lyrics tell the story of a child not born from a womb but in an experiment, thus having no true father or mother. The lyrics describe his plan to kill both the mother "who never gave birth to him" and then himself. However, he fails to kill himself, instead ending up mutilated and no better off than before. The child begs and prays for strength, but his dead mother does not answer. The narrative of the song is similar to Mary Shelley's Frankenstein, in that the character takes revenge for his misfortunes on his "parent" but ends up no different from before the "parent" died.

Music video
The video for Mutter follows the story of the song, in which Lindemann portrays a monstrous character who kills his mother and then dumps her body in a river before ending up locked in an underground cage. Lindemann has a bald head and is clad in rags for this role, but also portrays a well-dressed character with long hair who is seen rowing a boat in a swamp.

Live performances
The song debuted in its demo form during an April 2000 concert exclusively for members of the official fan club. The only difference between the demo version and the final release was that the demo version was less orchestrated. During the Mutter tour, it was played at every concert and played in select concerts in the Pledge of Allegiances tour in North America. The song then disappeared from Rammstein concerts until 2011, and has been a staple of their live shows since.

Track listing
 Mutter (Radio Edit) - 3:40
 Mutter (Vocoder Mix) - 4:32
 5/4 - 5:30
 Mutter (Sono's Inkubator Mix) - 7:22

The 2-track (card sleeve) edition included "Mutter (Radio Edit)" and "5/4".

It was originally planned to include a Remix by Arnaud Rebotini (Mutter Zend Avesta Mix) in the tracklist.

The promo single does not include track 5/4.

Charts

References

Songs about mothers
Songs about monsters
2002 singles
Rammstein songs
Songs written by Richard Z. Kruspe
Songs written by Paul Landers
Songs written by Till Lindemann
Songs written by Christian Lorenz
Songs written by Oliver Riedel
Songs written by Christoph Schneider